Benjamin Newton (born 10 October 1934) was an English professional footballer who played as an inside forward.

References

1934 births
Living people
Footballers from Grimsby
English footballers
Association football inside forwards
Grimsby Town F.C. players
English Football League players